Dua Malik (Urdu: دعا ملک) (born 1994) is a Pakistani singer, songwriter, host and composer. She hosted Sur Saath Savera on Express Entertainment in Pakistan. Malik has sung title songs of many Pakistani serials such as Ishq Mein Teray, Ranjhna and Ik Pagal Si Larki. She made her acting debut with a role of Amber in 2018 series Khafa Khafa Zindagi.

Early life 
Malik was born in 1994 in Quetta, Pakistan. She has an older brother Feroze Khan.

Personal life 
Malik is married to Sohail Haider, a musical artist. Together they have one daughter and two sons.

Discography 
 Ranjhna
 Ishq Mein Terray ft. Sohail Haider
 Ik Pagal Si Larki
 Mehke Mehke ft. Ahsan Khan
 Mehke Mehke Ye Fizayeen
Khuda Gawah
Tujh Se Hee Raabta

Compositions
 Zamana – Sohail Haider

Written
 Zamana – Sohail Haider

Television

References

External links
 

Living people
21st-century Pakistani actresses
1994 births
People from Quetta
Pakistani women singers
Pakistani television actresses
Pakistani television hosts
Pakistani women television presenters